Oye! It's Friday! was an Indian variety talk show on NDTV Imagine hosted by Farhan Akhtar. It featured a new celebrity every week. The show was made up of special performances by dancers and singers, jokes and light-hearted comedy.

Guest stars
 Karan Johar
 Priyanka Chopra
 Aamir Khan
 Arjun Rampal
 Shilpa Shetty
 Shahrukh Khan
 Sonam Kapoor
 Ranbir Kapoor
 Sourav Ganguly
 Deepika Padukone
 Hrithik Roshan
 Abhishek Bachchan
 Mugdha Godse
 Katrina Kaif
 Shankar–Ehsaan–Loy
 Kangana Ranaut

Performance Stars
 Amrita Arora 
 Kailash Kher
 Monica Bedi 
 Neha Dhupia 
 Tanushree Dutta
 Hard Kaur
 Suzanne D'Mello
 Shamita Shetty
 Hussain Kuwajerwala
 Anoushka Shankar

Season Finale
 Oye! It's Friday! came to an end on 20 March 2009, after a moderately successful run.

External links
 Oye! It's Friday! official website
 

Variety television series
Indian television talk shows